The 2008–09 season saw Barnet competed in Football League Two, alongside the FA Cup, Football League Cup and Football League Trophy.

Season summary 
The 2008–09 season started poorly, and by late September only the three teams that had been docked points prior to the start of the season had lower league positions. After a run of thirteen games without a win in any competition Paul Fairclough announced his resignation to take up a role as director and leaving the first team duties to his assistant Ian Hendon. Fairclough would take over one last game which resulted in a 2–0 win against another relegation threatened side AFC Bournemouth. Results improved, and before the end of the season Hendon was made permanent boss on a 2-year contract.

Competitions

Football League Two

Results

FA Cup

Football League Cup

Football League Trophy

Statistics

Appearances and goals

References 

Barnet F.C. seasons
Barnet_F.C.